Ottoway is an industrial suburb of Adelaide, South Australia, in the City of Port Adelaide Enfield local government area.

The suburb was laid out on section 1160, Hundred of Port Adelaide, the grant of which was in 1851 secured by one George Dale.
When the land was subdivided in 1883 the surveyors and vendors Ferry, Moore & Wallmann named the suburb "Ottoway".
Geoff Manning, in his Place Names of South Australia, idiosyncratically gives the spelling "Ottaway", and gives as its derivation the publican Thomas Finch Ottaway (c. 1816 – 21 July 1867), who in 1853 purchased the land from George Dale.

Ottoway's northern and western boundaries lie mainly along the Dry Creek-Port Adelaide railway line, and Grand Junction Road forms the suburb's southern boundary. The Port River Expressway also goes through this suburb.

References

Suburbs of Adelaide